The 2018 Primera División season, officially Liga de Fútbol Profesional Venezolano or Liga FUTVE, was the 37th professional season of Venezuela's top-flight football league. Monagas were the defending champions, but did not qualify to the Serie Final, after being eliminated in the regular season of the Torneo Apertura and by Caracas in the quarter-finals of the Torneo Clausura.

Zamora were the champions, defeating Deportivo Lara on the Serie Final, 5–1 on aggregate.

Teams

Stadia and locations

{|

|}

Gran Valencia reached the final of the Segunda División and earned promotion to the Primera División, but the team was suspended "temporarily" by the Honorary Council of the FVF after forfeiting the second leg of the final. On 15 January, Academia Puerto Cabello was announced as the replacement.

Managerial changes

Torneo Apertura

The Torneo Apertura is the first tournament of the season. The regular season started on 28 January and ended on 19 May.

Standings

Results

Knockout stage

Quarter-finals

|}

First leg

Second leg

Semi-finals

|}

First leg

Second leg

Final

Zamora won 2–1 on aggregate.

Top goalscorers

Torneo Clausura

The Torneo Clausura is the second tournament of the season. The regular season started on 21 July and ended on 28 October.

Standings

Results

Knockout stage

Quarter-finals

|}

First leg

Second leg

Semi-finals

|}

First leg

Second leg

Final

Deportivo Lara won 1–0 on aggregate.

Top goalscorers

Serie Final
The Serie Final is held between the champions of the Torneo Apertura and the Torneo Clausura to determine the champions of the season. The best team of the finalists in the aggregate table chose the order of the legs.

First leg

Second leg

Zamora won 5–1 on aggregate.

Aggregate table

References

External links
  of the Venezuelan Football Federation 
 Liga FUTVE

Venezuelan Primera División season
Venezuelan Primera División seasons
1